Slabber is a surname. Notable people with the surname include:

 Gerrie Slabber, South African rugby league player
 Jamie Slabber (born 1984), English footballer
 Wilbur Slabber (born 1980), Namibian cricketer